Soviet-era statues are statuary art as figured prominently in the art of the Soviet Union.

Soviet-era statues most frequently depicted significant state and party leaders, such as Joseph Stalin and Vladimir Lenin.

Communist symbology was of great importance for propaganda purposes. Such symbolism including other statues that were portrayals of realist allegorical figures in motion, figuratively striding forward into the new Soviet age, as well as Soviet role models, such as Nurkhon Yuldasheva.  

The only statue of Stalin in Budapest, Hungary, was destroyed by citizens during the 1956 Hungarian Revolution; no replacement was ever made.

There is a Soviet Statue park (Grutas Park, promoted to tourists as Stalin World) in Lithuania, and a Statue Park (Szoborpark) in Budapest, Hungary.

See also
 Socialist realism
 List of statues of Lenin
 Palace of Soviets
 List of Mother Motherland statues

References

External links
 Museum of Soviet statuary in Budapest

 Statues
.
.
Cold War statues